The Suburban is the largest English language weekly newspaper in the province of Quebec.

It is a community newspaper based in Montreal's Saint-Laurent borough which publishes three geographically based editions containing some shared and some location-specific content, to populations in Montreal's West Island, East End and inner suburbs, as well Laval—Quebec's third-largest city—located just north of Montreal on the adjacent island of Île Jésus. Total circulation of all three editions is 145,000—making it the largest weekly newspaper in Quebec.

The Suburban was established by Sophie Wollock on March 1, 1963, in the Montreal suburb of Côte-Saint-Luc. The Wollock family owned the newspaper until 1987, when it was sold to the Sochaczevski family. The newspaper's editor-in-chief is Beryl Wajsman. Its publisher is Michael Sochaczevski.

See also
List of newspapers in Canada

References

External links
The Suburban (official website)

Newspapers published in Montreal
Newspapers established in 1963
English-language newspapers published in Quebec
Saint-Laurent, Quebec
Weekly newspapers published in Quebec
1963 establishments in Quebec